"Beanball" is a colloquialism used in baseball, for a ball thrown at an opposing player with the intention of striking them such as to cause harm, often connoting a throw at the player's head (or "bean" in old-fashioned slang). A pitcher who throws beanballs often is known as a "headhunter". The term may be applied to any sport in which a player on one team regularly attempts to throw a ball toward the general vicinity of a player of the opposite team, but is typically expected not to hit that player with the ball. In cricket, the equivalent term is "beamer". Some people use the term "beaner", though that usage is discouraged due to its use as an ethnic slur in the United States.

Baseball 

In baseball, a beanball is a pitch, similar to a brushback pitch but actually intended to hit the batter as it is thrown at the head. It is rarely used as a strategic weapon, and is usually an act of anger and frustration; however, batters facing known headhunters are given a reason to fear a beanball and may alter their approach to hitting in the interests of self-protection, perhaps giving some strategic advantage to the pitcher. Some pitchers have been known to throw beanballs in response to giving up home runs. Teams with heated rivalries often find several beanballs exchanged in a season.

Beanballs can sometimes lead to fights, charging the mound, and bench-clearing brawls. Because of the hazards of the pitch and the possibility of fights, umpires will now often warn teams, after beanballs or fights have occurred, that any pitcher who throws at a batter will be ejected from the game with a mandatory one day suspension for the pitcher's manager. Throwing at batters can sometimes lead to suspension for a number of games as well. Managers may also be ejected if, in the umpire's judgment, they encouraged their pitcher to throw a beanball.

Several players' careers have been impaired or derailed after being struck with a beanball.  Hall of Famer Mickey Cochrane was knocked unconscious and later hospitalized for 7 days in 1937, and never played another game. In 1941, Dodgers outfielder Pete Reiser was hospitalized for a month, one of numerous injuries which shortened his career. Lou Boudreau played only sporadically after being beaned in 1951, and retired the following season. Tony Conigliaro missed over a year after being hit in the eye, and his vision later deteriorated to the point where he was forced to retire. Dickie Thon returned from a gruesome beaning in 1984, but never matched his earlier success. On September 28, 1995, Kirby Puckett, the superstar outfielder of the Minnesota Twins, was struck in the cheek by a Dennis Martínez fastball, breaking his jaw and loosening two teeth. It would be his last game; during spring training the following year he developed glaucoma, which ended his career. In 2005, the Cubs' Adam Greenberg was hit in the head with the first pitch that he faced in his major league career. Ron Santo, who thought he had lost an eye when his cheekbone was broken by a pitch in 1966, rushed back to the lineup. He described his attitude: "It was like, 'Here, hit me again.' I didn't have any fear. I just went on. When you get older, maybe fear does set in. Nobody will admit that, but it does happen." Don Zimmer, who was nearly killed by a beanball in 1953 and had four metal buttons surgically implanted in his skull, recounted, "It's not a case of being tougher than anybody else... You never know how you're going to react until you come back and play again."

Only one player has died after being hit in the head. Cleveland Indians shortstop Ray Chapman was hit by a pitch thrown by submarine pitcher and noted headhunter Carl Mays on August 16,  at the Polo Grounds in New York. He died 12 hours later and is noted as the only player to have been killed by a pitch. The following spring, Chapman's teammates experimented with leather helmets similar to those being used by football players; that year's Spalding Guide declared, "There is nothing 'sissy' about it." Catcher Roger Bresnahan is cited as one of the first players to construct and wear a helmet, in 1907.

Minor leaguers (as well as most college, high school, and youth leagues) must wear helmets with a flap covering each ear.

Further reading

References

External links

Baseball pitches
Baseball terminology
Violence in sports
Banned sports tactics
Major League Baseball controversies